The Hong Kong Film Critics Society (HKFCS; Traditional Chinese: 香港電影評論學會), founded in 1995, is the peak organization of film critics and professionals in Hong Kong. It is also a member of FIPRESCI.

Objectives
The objectives of the Hong Kong Film Critics Society are:
 to unite all critics who share our common goal; 
 to foster an independent spirit of film criticism;
 to encourage critical writing on Hong Kong cinema from the perspectives of culture and art;
 to reaffirm the achievements of Hong Kong cinema.

HKinema
The society also places great value on its quarterly journal HKinema, launched in 2007.

Notes

External links
 Hong Kong Film Critics Society Official Site

1995 establishments in Hong Kong
Cinema of Hong Kong
Organizations established in 1995